H. Lee Peterson (born October 16, 1964) is a veteran animation editor. His credits for Walt Disney Pictures include being an assistant editor for The Little Mermaid, and the lead film editor for Aladdin, Pocahontas, Dinosaur, Home on the Range and the short film The Prince and the Pauper; starring Mickey Mouse.

He has also worked for Disney's competitor DreamWorks Animation, where his credits include the first three Madagascar films, and Disney's younger sibling studio, Pixar as an additional film editor on Monsters University.

He most recently worked on Sony Pictures Animation's Smurfs: The Lost Village, released in 2017.

Peterson has been elected as a member in the American Cinema Editors.

He is married to Alex Rylance, with whom he has two children, and lives in the San Gabriel mountains.

References

External links

Living people
American Cinema Editors
American editors
DreamWorks Animation people
Pixar people
Walt Disney Animation Studios people
Sony Pictures Animation people
American film editors
1964 births